{{Infobox sports team
| name = FlyQuest
| logo = Flyquest logo 2021.svg
| logo_size = 250px
| alt = 
| caption = 
| short_name = FLY
| sport_label = Divisions
| sport = League of LegendsSuper Smash Bros. Melee
| founded = 
| current = 
| league = 
| conference = 
| division = 
| history = 
| city = Los Angeles, California
| location = United States
| arena = 
| ballpark = 
| stadium = 
| colours = 
| anthem = 
| owner = Viola Family
| ceo = Brian Anderson
| coach = 
| president = Chris Smith
| manager = Jeffrey Hoang
| gm = Nicholas Phan
| championships = 
| folded = 
| blank_label = 
| blank_data = 
| website = 
}}

FlyQuest is a professional esports organization based in the United States that was founded on January 6, 2017. It is owned by the Viola family, owners of the Florida Panthers.

FlyQuest was originally founded after the acquisition of the League of Legends roster of Cloud9 Challenger, which was the sister team of the Cloud9 organization. Cloud9 Challenger qualified for the North American League Championship Series in August 2016, alongside the main Cloud9 roster. LCS rules forbid an organization from owning multiple teams in the same league, so the team was sold to Milwaukee Bucks co-owner Wesley Edens and Fortress Investment Group and rebranded to FlyQuest, with the team roster unchanged.

Tricia Sugita was appointed as CEO in 2020, while Ryan Edens would move to a president position. She left the team on 13 June 2022, later becoming the Chief Marketing Officer for Cloud9. Micheal Choi was appointed as the new CEO. In September 2022, the Viola family, owners of the Florida Panthers, acquired Flyquest. In December 2022, Brian Anderson was appointed as the new CEO.

 League of Legends 

 Rosters 

 LCS team 

 Tournament results 

 Challengers team 

 Tournament results 

 Super Smash Bros. Melee 

 History Super Smash Bros. Melee player John "KoDoRiN" Ko was signed by FlyQuest on December 8, 2021. Jake "Jmook" DiRado became the organization's second Melee'' player on June 10, 2022.

Current roster

Rocket League 
FlyQuest made its first foray into Rocket League in September 2017, acquiring the eQuinox roster. This roster played in RLCS Season 4, finishing sixth in the regular season and missing out on a LAN spot after a 4–0 loss to Ghost Gaming in the regional playoffs. In the offseason between Seasons 4 and 5, Flyquest dropped their first roster and picked up the Ambition Esports roster. This team finished first in RLRS league play for Season 5, earning them a spot in the promotional playoffs. They went on to defeat Out of Style and Counter Logic Gaming in the playoffs, earning them a spot in the RLCS for Season 6. FlyQuest finished fifth in league play, but again missed out on a LAN spot after losing to NRG in the regional playoffs. In December 2018, FlyQuest announced that they would be dropping their Rocket League roster, with AyyJayy and Wonder being transferred to Rogue and Pluto staying with the organization as a content creator.

Former roster

Tournament results 
 Qualified for RLCS Season 4 league play by defeating Renegades 3–2 during the RLCS Season 4 North America Play-In
 Qualified for RLCS Season 6 league play by defeating Counter Logic Gaming 4–2 during the RLCS Season 5 Promotional Tournament

References

External links 
 

 
2017 establishments in California
Fighting game player sponsors
Super Smash Bros. player sponsors
Esports teams based in the United States
League of Legends Championship Series teams